Elisha Bruce Sam (born 31 March 1997) is a Belgian professional footballer who  plays as a forward for Patro Eisden Maasmechelen.

Club career
He made his Israeli Premier League debut for Hapoel Acre on 20 August 2017 in a game against Bnei Sakhnin as a 71st-minute substitute for Fejsal Mulić.

On 31 August 2018, he moved to the Netherlands, signing a one-year contract with FC Eindhoven, with the club holding a one-year extension option.

On 26 June 2019 he signed a contract with the newly promoted to the Bulgarian First League team Arda Kardzhali.  On 27 July, he scored two goals in a 3–1 home victory over Beroe, contributing to the historic first win for the team from Kardzhali in the top division of Bulgarian football.

On 31 August 2020, he signed for English National League side Notts County. Sam scored his first goal for the club in a 1–1 draw at Halifax Town on 17 November 2020, before scoring again against Wealdstone in a 3–0 win 10 days later. On 27 February 2021, Sam scored a stunning back-heel volley in the club's FA Trophy quarter-final win over Oxford City, with many pundits already calling it the Puskás Award winner for the year. Sam was awarded the National League Player of the Month award for February 2022, scoring four goals across the month. On 1 June 2022, Sam had his contract terminated by mutual consent. 

On June 23, Elisha signed a contract with the Belgian team Patro Eisden Maasmechelen, which plays in the Belgian National Division 1.

Career statistics

References

External links
 

1997 births
Living people
Belgian people of Israeli descent
Footballers from Antwerp
Belgian footballers
Association football forwards
Hapoel Acre F.C. players
Hapoel Nof HaGalil F.C. players
FC Eindhoven players
FC Arda Kardzhali players
Notts County F.C. players
K. Patro Eisden Maasmechelen players
Israeli Premier League players
Liga Leumit players
Eerste Divisie players
First Professional Football League (Bulgaria) players
National League (English football) players
Belgian National Division 1 players
Belgian expatriate footballers
Expatriate footballers in Israel
Expatriate footballers in the Netherlands
Expatriate footballers in Bulgaria
Expatriate footballers in England
Belgian expatriate sportspeople in Israel
Belgian expatriate sportspeople in the Netherlands
Belgian expatriate sportspeople in Bulgaria
Belgian expatriate sportspeople in England